Praesel is an unincorporated community and census-designated place (CDP) in Milam County, Texas, United States. It was first listed as a CDP in the 2020 census with a population of 446.

It is in the southwest part of the county, bordered to the north by Rockdale. Farm-to-Market Road 487 runs through the center of the CDP, leading north into Rockdale and south to U.S. Route 77, which forms the eastern edge of the CDP. US-77 leads north  to Cameron and south  to Giddings.

References 

Populated places in Milam County, Texas
Census-designated places in Milam County, Texas
Census-designated places in Texas